is a Japanese novel by author Shizuko Natsuki, originally published in 1982. It has been adapted into several Japanese television dramas and a film.

Plot
"I've stabbed Grandpa to death." With these words, rich heiress Chiyo Wada incriminated herself in the murder of her grandfather, Yohei Wada, the patriarch of a rich family owning a large conglomerate. Chiyo had brought along her friend Jane Prescott to spend the New Year holidays with her family: Yohei, grandmother Mine, grand-uncle Shigeru, mother Yoshie, stepfather Sawahiko, cousin Takuo, and Dr. Shohei Mazaki, who's rumored to be an illegitimate member of the family.

When Yohei is killed, the investigation is undertaken by detectives Ukyo Nakazato and Katsubei Aiura, who have more questions than answers. Did Chiyo really murder her own grandfather, a known playboy who often groped her? Or was she set up by another family member? The answers will be decisive for the Wada family to stay together - or break apart...

Notes
A few of the main characters had their names changed:

Shizuko Natsuki's original title Daburyū no Higeki is a tribute to Ellery Queen's Tragedy of... novels of the 1930s, which ran from X to Z and had Drury Lane as protagonist.

In other media
For the English version of the book, the Japanese character  was replaced with the American character Jane Prescott. This character was not changed in audiovisual media adaptations, although Haruo Ichijō has varied degrees of relationship with the rich heiress  depending on the adaptation.

TV drama
Daburyū no Higeki was made into TV dramas in 1983, 1986, 2001, 2010 and 2012. The first four iterations were miniseries lasting no more than two episodes; the last iteration lasted 8 episodes weekly, the lowest average for a typical season drama.

Film

The novel was adapted into a film in 1984, directed by Shinichiro Sawai.

Bibliography

References

1982 Japanese novels
Japanese crime novels
Japanese novels adapted into films
Ballantine Books books
Novels set in Yamanashi Prefecture